The apical flycatcher (Myiarchus apicalis) is a species of bird in the family Tyrannidae. It is endemic to Colombia. Its natural habitats are subtropical or tropical dry forests and arid and semi-arid open areas.

Taxonomy

The species was first described in 1881 by the English zoologist Philip Sclater. The genus name derives the Ancient Greek muia - fly, and arkhos - ruler or chief. The species name comes from the Latin apical - of the point or tip - in reference to the white tips of the bird's tail feathers. The species is monotypic, having no recognized subspecies.

Description

The apical flycatcher is a typical representative of the Myiarchus flycatchers: a slim, medium-sized bird with few really distinctive features. The bird is 18-19cm in length, with greyish-olive upperparts. The wings are dusky, with whitish fringes to the tertials and coverts showing as two faint wing bars. The crown of the head is brownish-olive. The bird's throat and breast are pale grey. The underparts are mainly pale yellow. The tail is dusky with a greyish-olive underside. The tips of the tail feathers are white, which is diagnostic when compared to other Myiarchus flycatchers in its range.

Males and females are identical in appearance. Juveniles have rufous fringes to their wing feathers.

Distribution and habitat

The apical flycatcher is found in the tropical and temperate zones of Colombia at lower altitudes - from 400m and upwards. Authorities differ on the upper limit of their range, providing numbers between 1700-2500m. The species is locally frequent in dry forest, arid and semi-arid open areas, savannas, and fields with scattered trees or light woodland, in the upper basins of the Magdalena River, the Cauca River and the Patiá and Dagua Rivers.

References

apical flycatcher
Birds of the Colombian Andes
Endemic birds of Colombia
apical flycatcher
apical flycatcher
apical flycatcher
Taxonomy articles created by Polbot